The Oaklands Wolves are an English sports club and academy based in St Albans, Hertfordshire. Based at Oaklands College, the basketball academy has an official team which competes professionally in the National Basketball League and Women's British Basketball League. Students at Oaklands College can enrol on a number of different academies including basketball, football, rugby, hockey, athletics and cycling.

Professional basketball teams

Women's team

History
The Wolves compete in the Women's British Basketball League, the premier women's basketball competition in the United Kingdom. The Wolves entered the league in 2016, and finished 10th in their inaugural season.  The team qualified for the WBBL Playoffs for the first time during the 2018-19 season, finishing 8th in the league with a 9-13 record.

Season-by-season records

Men's team

History
In July 2020, the Wolves organisation merged with National Basketball League Division 1 side Essex & Herts Leopards, competing from the 2020-21 NBL D1 season as the Oaklands Wolves. The Wolves were in partnership with the Leopards from the 2018-19 season, providing opportunities for academy players to train and play with the team, as well as a home venue for training and matches.

Season-by-season records

Academy & Junior teams
The foundations of the whole Wolves programme are based around an elite-level academy formed at Oaklands College in 2009.  Oaklands compete in both the EABL and WEABL, the premier under-19s basketball competitions in the United Kingdom.

Notable former players
  Benjamin Lawson

References

Women's British Basketball League teams
Women's basketball teams in England
St Albans
Sport in Hertfordshire
Basketball teams established in 2009
2009 establishments in England